Each year the Premier Volleyball League (formerly Shakey's V-League) organises several women's volleyball competitions in the Philippines.

Types of Conference

Active Conferences
 SVL Open Conference - PLDT Home Telpad Turbo Boosters
 SVL Collegiate Conference - NU Lady Bulldogs
 SVL Reinforced Conference - PLDT Home Ultera Ultra Fast Hitters

Inactive Conferences
 SVL 1st Conference - FEU Lady Tamaraws (SVL 11th Season)
 SVL 2nd Conference - Adamson Lady Falcons (SVL 7th Season)

Special Conferences
 SEA Club Invitational - Vietsovpetro (SVL Season 8)
 SVL All Star - Smart All Stars (SVL Season 10)

List of Conferences

2000's
2004-2005 Shakey's V-League Season
Season 1, 1st Conference
Season 1, 2nd Conference
2005-2006 Shakey's V-League Season
Season 2, 1st Conference
Season 2, 2nd Conference
2006 Shakey's V-League Season
2007 Shakey's V-League Season
Season 4, 1st Conference
Season 4, 2nd Conference
2008 Shakey's V-League Season
Season 5, 1st Conference
Season 5, 2nd Conference
2009 Shakey's V-League Season
Season 6, 1st Conference
Season 6, 2nd Conference

2010's
2010 Shakey's V-League Season
Season 7, 1st Conference
Season 7, 2nd Conference
2011 Shakey's V-League Season
Season 8, 1st Conference
Season 8, Open Conference
Season 8, Invitational Cup
2012 Shakey's V-League Season
Season 9, 1st Conference
Season 9, Open Conference
2013 Shakey's V-League Season
Season 10, 1st Conference
Season 10, Open Conference
Season 10, All-Star Weekend
2014 Shakey's V-League Season
Season 11, 1st Conference
Season 11, Open Conference
Season 11, Reinforced Open Conference
2015 Shakey's V-League Season
Season 12, Open Conference
Season 12, Collegiate Conference
Season 12, Reinforced Open Conference
2016 Shakey's V-League Season
Season 13, Open Conference
Season 13, Collegiate Conference
Season 13, Reinforced Open Conference

References